Paul Ernest Sandlands  (25 May 1878 – 8 March 1962) was an English barrister and judge.

Sandlands was the son of J. P. Sandlands, the Vicar of Brigstock, Northamptonshire. He was educated privately and at Trinity College, Cambridge, where he read law. Immediately after graduation he joined the City Imperial Volunteers Mounted Infantry and served in the South African War. In 1900 he was called to the Bar by the Inner Temple and joined the Midland Circuit, building up a successful practice. He held the rank of commander in the Birmingham Special Constabulary during the First World War.

In 1915 he was appointed Recorder of Newark, one of the youngest recorders in the country. In 1928 he was made a Bencher, in 1932 became Recorder of Leicester, and in 1935 took silk. In 1944 he became Recorder of Birmingham and held the post until his retirement in 1959.

Sandlands was appointed Officer of the Order of the British Empire (OBE) in the 1920 civilian war honours for his police service.

Footnotes

References
Obituary, The Times, 10 March 1962

1878 births
1962 deaths
Alumni of Trinity College, Cambridge
Birmingham City Police
British Army personnel of the Second Boer War
British special constables
City Imperial Volunteers officers
20th-century English judges
Members of the Inner Temple
Officers of the Order of the British Empire
People from North Northamptonshire